The Pingyao–Luoyang Expressway, designated as G0513 and commonly abbreviated as Pingluo Expressway is a north-south expressway start from Pingyao, Shanxi Province through Qinyuan, Anze, Qinshui, Yangcheng, Mengjin, to Luoyang, Henan Province. This expressway is a spur of G5 Jingkun Expressway.

Detailed itinerary

Expressways in Shanxi